Maui National Wildlife Refuge Complex is a National Wildlife Refuge complex in the state of Hawaii.

Refuges within the complex
Kakahaia National Wildlife Refuge
Kealia Pond National Wildlife Refuge

References
Directory listing for the complex

National Wildlife Refuges in Hawaii